MJO is the Madden–Julian oscillation, the largest element of the intraseasonal variability in the tropical atmosphere.

MJO may also refer to:
 ISO 639:mjo, the ISO 639 code for the Malankuravan language
 Mount Etjo Airport, the IATA code MJO
 Metropolitan Jazz Octet, a group created by Chicago saxophonist and arranger Tom Hilliard

See also 
 M JO, a fashion label created by Taiwanese singer and actor Jiro Wang